Olomouc Region is an administrative unit of the Czech Republic, located in the north-western and central part of its historical region of Moravia (Morava) and in a small part of the historical region of Czech Silesia (České Slezsko). It is named for its capital Olomouc.

Olomouc region borders with the Moravian-Silesian Region (in the east), Zlín Region (in the south-east), South Moravian Region (in the south-west) and Pardubice Region (in the west). Furthermore, the region shares a 104 km long border with Poland (in the north).

Administrative divisions
The Olomouc Region is divided into 5 districts:

On the territory of the region there are 13 administrative districts of municipalities with extended powers and 20 administrative districts of municipalities with authorized local authority.

Population

In January 2019 the population of the Olomouc Region totalled 632,492 inhabitants. As of 2019, 50.3% of region’s population lived in municipalities with more than 4,000. Out of 402 municipalities located in the region (including one military area), 30 had a status of town. Region’s capital Olomouc is with approximately 100 thousand inhabitants the largest city. With 120.1 inhabitants per km2 the region was close to the national average of 135 inhabitants per km2. There were, of course, differences within the region: the lowest population density was in the Jeseník District.
In the long term, the population of the region has been aging. The average age of population in 2019 is 42.8, which is the 4th highest among regions in the Czech Republic.

Cities and towns
The table below provides the list of region's most populous cities and towns as of 1 January 2019:

Geography

The total area of the region amounts to 5,267 km2, which is 6.7% of the entire area of the Czech Republic.
The northern part of the region is of mountainous nature. The Jeseníky mountains are located here, including Praděd, which is the highest point of the region (1,492 m above sea level). The southern part of the region consists of the Hanakian lowland. The lowest point of the region is situated on the water level of the Morava River near to Kojetín in the Přerov District (190 m above sea level).
The Morava river flows through the region and the majority of the region's territory belongs to Morava’s drainage basin. A small northern part of the region belongs to the drainage basin of Odra River, which flows to the Baltic Sea.
The Olomouc Region offers a great variety of natural points of interest. Protected landscape area of the Jeseníky mountains offers a number of scenic places such as the largest Moravian peatbog Rejvíz and the 45m high Vysoký Waterfall. Another scenic place is Dlouhé Stráně water reservoir situated on the top of a hill. Protected landscape area Litovelské Pomoraví offers floodplain forests with many endangered species of plants and animals. Finally, many caves can be found in the region: Javoříčko Caves, Mladeč Caves and Zbrašov aragonite caves.

Economy

The region's economy focuses on traditional agriculture, processing industry and
services. Conditions for further development of the region are its attractive location, transport accessibility, developed infrastructure, enough qualified labour force and entry of foreign investors. 
In 2011, the total economically active population of the Olomouc Region was 307.2 thousand people, of which 283.9 thousand were employed and 23.3 thousand unemployed. The unemployment rate in 12/2022 was 3,6%. 
The Olomouc Region is an industrial area with developed services. The economy of the
Hanakian districts is more stable and diverse than the economy of the Jeseník District and northern part of the Šumperk District. The latter two districts belong to economically weaker regions due to their position, transport accessibility and disturbance of social and economic life after the Second World War (displacement of German population).
The gross domestic product of the Olomouc Region amounted to 4.7% of the nation GDP in 2021. The GDP per capita of the region reaches 79.4% of the national average. The average monthly wage of employees in the region reached 36,481 CZK (EUR 1520) in 3Q/2022.
Significant sectors of the region’s economy are agriculture, food industry, textile and clothing industry, manufacture of machinery, optics and optical equipment.
In 2011, there were 138,970 businesses, organisations and entrepreneurs based in the region. Most of them were private entrepreneurs registered according to the trade law (76.6%) and business companies (8.4%). 157 industrial enterprises had 100 or more employees, employing in total 41,222 employees.

Agriculture
The share of arable land was 39.4% in 2011 but was showing a decreasing trend over past years while the share of non-agricultural land has been increasing and reached 46.9% in 2011.
Southern and central parts of the region belong to areas with the most fertile land. Crop yields (barley, wheat, rape and industrial sugar beet) reach the highest amounts of the entire country.

Transport
Transport accessibility of the region is provided by 3,582 km of roads, of which only 12.3% are first class roads. The motorways with two lanes connect Olomouc with Brno (I/46), Ostrava (I/35 followed by D1) and the Pardubice Region (I/35). Once finished, the d1 motorway will connect Brno with Ostrava and will cross the southern part of Olomouc Region.
There is 601 km of railways in the region. Important rail junctions are in Olomouc and Přerov. The railway network is spread equally all over the Region´s territory. Road network is denser in the southern flat part of the Region.
Near to the city of Olomouc there is an airport for small airliners, which obtained status of an international airport.

Tourism
The Olomouc Region belongs to regions with the smallest number of accommodation establishments. In 2009 there were 338 collective accommodation establishments. These were placed primarily in the Jeseník District and the Šumperk District that are most visited by tourists.

Quality of life
In 2011, 14,347 crimes were committed in the region, of which 6,744 (47%) were solved.
Compared to other regions of the Czech Republic, the environment of Olomouc Region can be marked as relatively less damaged. The values of specific emissions do not reach the average national values. Mountain areas and foothills have excellent air quality and are important sources of drinking water.

Health care
In 2011 the region counted 9 hospitals, 16 specialized therapeutic institutions and other health establishments by 2,897 physicians and 6,466 paramedical workers. Health care is provided also in many spa establishments that are placed all over the region. Well known spas are in Jeseník, Velké Losiny, Teplice nad Bečvou, Slatinice, Skalka, etc.

Education
In 2011, the network of school establishments consists of 367 nursery schools, 369 basic schools, 20 grammar schools, 81 programmes vocational training and 8 higher schools. The second oldest university in the Czech Republic, the Palacký University, is situated in Olomouc. It is attended by over 23,000 students.

Places of interest

 Bouzov Castle;
 Hanakian region with its folkways, folklore shows and festivals that are organised in Náměšť, Prostějov, Kojetín, etc.
 Helfštýn castle;
 Jánský vrch château;
 Náměšť na Hané château;
 Olomouc with a large urban conservation area preserving a large set of buildings that are important for their historical, architectonic or artistic value;
 Sovinec castle;
 Svatý Kopeček with its well-known Pilgrimage Church of the Visitation of the Virgin Mary
 Šternberk castle;
 Tovačov château;
 Úsov château; 
 Velké Losiny château, historic paper factory, spa; 
 For winter sports many downhill courses and pistes are prepared in the Jeseníky mountains in areas of Červenohorské sedlo, Kouty nad Desnou, Petříkov, Ostružná, Ramzová and many others.

International relations
Olomouc Region cooperates with:

 Baranya County, Hungary
 Fujian, China
 Ganja, Azerbaijan
 Green River Area, United States
 Kostroma Oblast, Russia
 Opole Voivodeship, Poland
 Province of Reggio Emilia, Italy
 Vojvodina, Serbia
 Würzburg District, Germany
 Yunnan, China

Gallery

References

External links

  
 Region statistics

 
Regions of the Czech Republic